German Canadian Club of London Field is a multi-purpose stadium in London, Ontario, Canada. It is currently used mostly for football matches and is the home ground of German Canadian FC and FC London (League 1 only). The stadium holds 1,000 spectators. The stadium field meets all FIFA standards and is comparable to size of most fields in the German Bundesliga. The stadium has a daily maintenance program, change rooms, food and beverage services, and a large licensed patio.

The soccer facility can also accommodate 4v4, 7v7, and 9v9 youth soccer pitches.

External links
German Canadian Club
German Canadian FC London
FC London (League1 only)

Multi-purpose stadiums in Canada
Soccer venues in Canada
Sports venues in London, Ontario
1952 establishments in Ontario
Sports venues completed in 1952